KKDC (93.3 FM) is a radio station licensed to Dolores, Colorado. Currently, the station carries an album-oriented rock (AOR) format and is owned by Four Corners Broadcasting LLC.

Programming
Aside from rock music, the station carries local Dolores High School football from September through November and basketball from January through March.

References

External links

KDC
Radio stations established in 2003
Album-oriented rock radio stations in the United States
2003 establishments in Colorado